Coptobasis monochromalis is a moth in the family Crambidae. It was described by Francis Walker in 1865. It is found on the Sula Islands.

References

Moths described in 1865
Spilomelinae